Dănuț Marin "Dan" Dumbravă (born 6 August 1981 in Bucharest) is a former Romanian rugby union footballer and current head coach of CSA Steaua București. He played as a fly-half and a fullback.

Career
Dumbravă played for his entire career with Bucharest side CSA Steaua București in the Romanian Rugby Championship. He also played for București Wolves.

International
Dumbravă has 73 caps for Romania, with 3 tries, 73 conversions, 74 penalties and 2 drop goals scored, in an aggregate of 389 points. This makes him one of the top scorers for his country. His first match was at 1 November 2002, in a 40–3 loss to Wales, in Wrexham, in a friendly game. Dumbravă played three games at the 2003 Rugby World Cup finals, but was only capped once at the 2007 Rugby World Cup finals. Nevertheless, he scored a conversion in his country's 14–10 win over Portugal. He was called for the 2011 Rugby World Cup, playing in three games and scoring 5 penalties, 15 points on aggregate. He was called once again for the 2015 Rugby World Cup, playing in a single game, as a substitute, without scoring.

Notes

External links

Romanian rugby union players
Romanian rugby union coaches
Rugby union fly-halves
Rugby union players from Bucharest
1981 births
Living people
Romania international rugby union players
CSA Steaua București (rugby union) players
București Wolves players